The 2010 CECAFA Senior Challenge Cup (known as the CECAFA Tusker Cup for sponsorship reasons) is the 34th edition of the competition. The host of the tournament is Tanzania.

Participants

 (invitee) 

 (invitee)

 (hosts) 
 (holders)
 (invitee)

Information
Eritrea and Djibouti were left out due to missing the deadline for the draw.

The winner team will receive $30,000 USD, the runner up will receive $20,000 USD and third place will receive $10,000 USD. There will also be prizes for the best team, best goalkeeper and top scorer among others.

In the event that one of the invited teams wins the tournament, a replica trophy will be handed over and the prize money.

East African Breweries Limited (EABL) agreed to sponsor the tournament. They paid $450,000 USD.

All the games will be played in Dar Es Salaam to allow easy TV coverage by Super Sport.

Group stage

Group A

Group B

Group C

Ranking of Third-placed Teams
At the end of the first stage, a comparison was made between the third-placed teams of each group. The two best third-placed teams advanced to the quarter-finals.

Knockout stage

Quarter-finals

Semi-finals

Third place play-off

Final

Goalscorers
5 goals
 Felix Sunzu

4 goals
 Kipre Tchetche
 Umed Ukuri
 Emmanuel Okwi

3 goals
 Shimelis Bekele
 Nurdin Bakari

2 goals

 Fred Ajwang
 Davi Banda
 Victor Nyirenda
 Shadrack Nsajigwa
 Henry Kisekka
 Ahmed Ali Salum

1 goal

 Jean-Paul Habarugira
 Claude Nahimana
 Kipre Bolou
 Zoumana Kone
 Fabrice Kouadio
 Tesfaye Alebachew
 Abebaw Butako
 John Baraza
 Henry Kabichi
 Daddy Birori
 Peter Kagabo
 John Boko
 Henry Shindika
 Simeon Masaba
 Sula Matovu
 Tony Mawejje
 Andrew Mwesigwa
 Mike Sserumaga
 Venecious Mapande
 Kennedy Mudenda
 Allan Mukuka
 Aggrey Morris
 Mcha Khamis

References

External links
Official Site

2010
2010
2010 in African football